Events during the year 2023 in Ireland.

Incumbents

 President: Michael D. Higgins 
 Taoiseach: Leo Varadkar (FG)
 Tánaiste: Michael Martin (FF)
 Minister for Finance: Michael McGrath (FF)
 Chief Justice: Donal O'Donnell
 Dáil: 33rd
 Seanad: 26th

Events

January

 2 January – A man was charged with the murder of Brazilian woman, Bruna Fonseca, who was found beaten and strangled in a flat in Cork on New Year's Day.
 3 January – There were 931 patients without beds in Irish hospitals as the trolley crisis reached a record high.
 4 January – The Irish data privacy board fined Meta Platforms €390 million for violations of the General Data Protection Regulation on Facebook and Instagram.
 5 January – Met Éireann confirmed that 2022 was the hottest year in Ireland.
 13 January
 A man was arrested on suspicion of murder of a woman whose body was found in an apartment in Dublin.
 Two men were arrested after the fatal stabbing of a man in Finglas, the second such event in north Dublin in the previous 24 hours.
 Students Shane O'Connor and Liam Carew from County Tipperary won the 59th Young Scientist Exhibition.
 15 January – An Irish citizen was reported on board a plane which crashed in the resort town of Pokhara in Nepal. All 72 passengers were killed.
 17 January – A 24-year-old man was facing life in prison after he admitted murdering a vulnerable 76-year-old man, originally from China, at his home in Dublin in April 2021.
 19 January – Argos retailer announced its intention to close all stores and operations in the Republic of Ireland at the end of June with the loss of 580 jobs.
 21 January
 Thousands of people marched in Limerick to protest against continued overcrowding at University Hospital Limerick.
 A man was arrested after biting off part of a traffic garda's finger during an assault in Ballymun, Dublin.
 22 January – A man was arrested after an 89-year-old patient was killed in a violent assault at Mercy University Hospital in Cork.

February

 3 February – The band Wild Youth were chosen to represent Ireland in the Eurovision Song Contest 2023, scheduled to take place in Liverpool, England.
 6 February – The coronation stone for the High Kings of Ireland on the Hill of Tara – the Lia Fáil – was vandalised when the word "Fake" was spray painted on the 5,000-year-old granite stone.
 7 February
Government ministers met with aviation and police authorities for briefing on illegal unmanned aerial vehicle activity at Dublin Airport between 4–6 February which forced suspension of flying and diversions of flights to other airports.
Munster Technological University announced that it was investigating a significant breach of its information technology and telephone systems. It was later confirmed that the university suffered a ransomware cyber attack.
 9 February
An Irish man in his 30s was shot and killed in New South Wales in Australia.
Microsoft announced that it would cut 120 jobs from its Irish-based workforce as part of a global cost-cutting plan.
 11 February – Three teenagers died after a car entered a river at Menlo Pier on the outskirts of Galway city.
 12 February – Munster Technological University announced that information stolen from its computer systems in a cyberattack a week ago had appeared on the dark web.
 18 February – Up to 50,000 people participated in an "Ireland for All" march and rally in Dublin in support of refugees and asylum seekers, and opposing racism and far-right groups.
 19 February – An Irish bishop, David G. O'Connell, was shot dead in Los Angeles, California.
 20 February – A 17-year-old boy was sentenced to life in prison for murdering 49-year-old Urantsetseg Tserendorj who was walking home from work in Dublin's north inner city in 2021.
 21 February
The Government agreed a more targeted cost-of-living package, along with some universal payments, with €470m to be allocated for social protection measures.
Dublin Airport suspended flights for thirty minutes during the evening in response to illegal unmanned aerial vehicle activity nearby. It was the fifth time in three weeks that airline flights were interrupted.
 22 February – Róisín Shortall and Catherine Murphy announced that they would stand down as co-leaders of the Social Democrats, with a successor to be appointed "at an early date."
 23 February – A 19-year-old man was in a critical condition in hospital after a serious assault in Swords in north Dublin. A 20-year-old man was arrested and subsequently charged.
 26 February
Holly Cairns was announced as the next leader of the Social Democrats after all the party's other TDs ruled themselves out of any potential leadership contest.
A 19-year-old man, who was seriously assaulted in Swords on 23 February died in hospital.
 27 February – A man in his 60s was arrested after a man in his 30s was stabbed to death at a house in Kilkenny city.
 28 February – Minister for Education Norma Foley reversed a plan for Leaving Certificate candidates to sit Paper 1 of their English and Irish exams at the end of fifth year, after facing strong opposition from a number of organisations, including teacher and student representative bodies.

March

 1 March – A major emergency was declared at Wexford General Hospital as a result of a fire, with four wards including the ICU and over 200 patients being evacuated.
 3 March – A 51-year-old criminal was sentenced to life in prison for the murder of 19-year-old Conor O'Brien in County Meath in August 2021 after he delivered a pizza to him.
 8 March
 The report of a 20-year survey by The Botanical Society of Britain and Ireland revealed that 56% of Ireland's native plant species are in decline due to habitat loss, altered grazing pressure, and degradation (re-seeding, over-fertilising, nitrogen deposition, herbicides, soil drainage, mineral enrichment), rather than rising temperatures whose effects – so far – are minor. By contrast, 80% of non-native plants introduced into Ireland since 1500 have increased.
 The Taoiseach Leo Varadkar marked International Women's Day by announcing the Government's intention to hold a referendum in November to enshrine gender equality in the Constitution by amending Articles 40 and 41. Other referenda on separate issues may be held at the same time.
 9 March – Met Éireann issued a Status Orange snow and ice warning for much of the country with significant accumulations of snow and icy conditions forecast.
 13 March – The United States President Joe Biden announced that he will visit Ireland, north and south, in April for the 25th anniversary of the Good Friday Agreement (signed on 10 April 1998).
 15 March – 46-year-old Stephen Silver was found guilty of the capital murder of Detective Garda Colm Horkan who was shot dead in Castlerea in June 2020.
 16 March – Ryan Tubridy announced that he would be stepping down as the presenter of The Late Late Show after 14 years, with his last show in May.
 17 March
 Celebrations took place across the island of Ireland with massive crowds turning out to mark Saint Patrick's Day in towns and cities, with half a million people descending on Dublin city centre.
 Taoiseach Leo Varadkar held talks with US President Joe Biden as the two leaders marked Saint Patrick's Day at the White House.
 18 March – Ireland won the Grand Slam after a 29-16 victory over England at the Aviva Stadium.

Deaths

January

 9 January – Séamus Begley, 73, traditional musician and singer.
 16 January 
Carrie Acheson, 88, politician, TD (1981–1982).
Joe Martin, 91, footballer (Dundalk, League of Ireland XI).
 18 January – John L. Murray, 79, jurist, chief justice (2004–2011), judge of the Supreme Court (1999–2015) and the ECJ (1992–1999).
 19 January 
Bertie Cunningham, 83, Gaelic footballer (Ballivor, Meath senior team).
Peter Thomas, 78, footballer (Waterford, Galway United, national team). Born in England.
 20 January – Pierce Higgins, 45, hurler (Tooreen, Ballyhaunis, Mayo senior team), motor neuron disease.
 21 January – Micheál Mac Gréil, 91, Jesuit priest, sociologist and writer.
 30 January – Eddie Spence, 97, Gaelic footballer (Belfast O'Connell's, Antrim senior team). Born in Northern Ireland.
 31 January – Donie Hanlon, 85, Gaelic footballer (Gracefield, Offaly senior team).

February

 1 February – Billy Galligan, 86, hurler (Charleville, Blackrock, Claughaun, Avondhu, Cork senior team).
 6 February – Niamh Bhreathnach, 77, politician, TD (1992–1997), Minister for Education (1993–1994 and 1994–1997).
 7 February – Richard Kell, 95, poet, composer and teacher.
 11 February – Séamus Ryan, hurler (Cappamore, Limerick senior team).
 12 February 
James Flynn, 57, film and television producer (Vikings, The Last Duel, The Banshees of Inisherin).
Theo Dunne, 85, footballer (Shelbourne) and manager (UCD).
 13 February – Deirdre Purcell, 77, actress, journalist, broadcaster and author.
 18 February – David G. O'Connell, 69, Roman Catholic prelate (Auxiliary Bishop of Los Angeles (2015–2023).
 22 February 
Mick Burns, 85, hurler (Nenagh Éire Óg, Tipperary senior team, Munster).
Dermot Kelly, 90, hurler (Claughaun, Limerick senior team, Munster).
 24 February – Tom Tierney, 46, rugby union player (Garryowen, Munster, Leicester, national team) and coach (women's national team).
 26 February 
Tony O'Donoghue, 86, athlete and broadcaster.
Kieron Wood, 73, barrister, journalist and writer.
 28 February 
Brian O'Brien, 83, rugby union player (Shannon, Munster, national team) and manager (Shannon, Munster, national team).
Jimmy Hatton, 88, Gaelic footballer and hurler (Kilcoole, Wicklow senior teams) and referee.

March

 2 March – Bertie O'Brien, 71, Gaelic footballer and hurler (St. Finbarr's, Cork senior teams).
 3 March 
Camille Souter, 93, artist.
Rita O'Hare, 80, Republican activist.
 5 March – Maurice Scully, 70, poet.
 10 March – Niall Brophy, 87, rugby union player (Leinster, national team, Lions).
 12 March – Liam Kearns, 61, Gaelic footballer (Austin Stacks, Kerry senior team) and manager (Limerick, Laois, Tipperary, Offaly).
 20 March – Tom Ryan, 81, hurler (Killenaule, Éire Óg, James Stephens, Tipperary senior team).

References